Sir Christopher John Benson   (born 20 July 1933) is a British chartered surveyor and company director, formerly chairman of major companies and public bodies and a High Sheriff of Wiltshire.

Benson was born in Staffordshire in 1933, the son of Charles Woodburn Benson, by his marriage to Catherine Clara Bishton. He trained as a chartered surveyor and became a Fellow of the Royal Institution of Chartered Surveyors. He was knighted in 1988. Also in 1988, he became a director of Sun Alliance and in 1993 was elected as its chairman. In 1997, he was appointed by the government to chair its Funding Agency for Schools.

Benson has also served as chairman of MEPC plc, Costain Group, Boots, Albright and Wilson, and the London Docklands Development Corporation. Outside business, he is a vice-president of the Royal Society of Arts, a past High Sheriff of Wiltshire, a past Master of the Company of Watermen and Lightermen and a President of the Coram Foundation.  He is an honorary bencher of the Middle Temple, serving on its Scholarship Fund Appeal Committee.

Benson was awarded an honorary Medal of the Order of Australia on 28 January 2020 for service to the bilateral relationship between Australia and the United Kingdom.

Personal life
In 1960, in Salisbury, Benson married Margaret Josephine Bundy, a daughter of Ernest Jefferis Bundy. A justice of the peace, mayor of Salisbury (1969-1970), and a deputy lieutenant of Wiltshire, Jo Benson was awarded the OBE in 1973. She died on 1 August 2022.

Notes

1933 births
Chartered Surveyors
Deputy Lieutenants of Wiltshire
High Sheriffs of Wiltshire
Honorary Recipients of the Medal of the Order of Australia
Living people
Deputy Lieutenants of Greater London